The southern lesser bamboo lemur (Hapalemur meridionalis), also known as the southern bamboo lemur, rusty-gray lesser bamboo lemur, and southern gentle lemur, is a species of bamboo lemur endemic to southern Madagascar.

Taxonomy
It was originally considered to be a subspecies of the eastern lesser bamboo lemur (Hapalemur griseus), and is of similar size, but is darker and redder than the eastern lesser bamboo lemur, with a shorter tail and different vocalizations. The type locality is the forestry station of Mandena, and it is further supported as a separate species by recent mitochondrial DNA research.

Distribution
This species is found in three national parks; (Andohahela, Andringitra and Midongy du Sud), three special reserves (Kalambatritra, Manombo and Pic d' Ivohibe), Tsitongambarika Protected Area, and in the Mandena Conservation Zone.

Ecology
They live in groups of four to seven and sometimes there is more than one breeding female. Latrine behaviour has been observed where adults urinate, in turn, at specific sites followed by juveniles – it is thought this behaviour could be territorial or has some other communication function. In Madena forest groups forage on the ground eating various grasses in areas of sparse tree cover and swamps, and have also been observed in reed beds along the estuaries of Evahtra.

Conservation
The southern lesser bamboo lemu is listed by the Convention on International Trade in Endangered Species of Wild Fauna and Flora (CITES) on Appendix 1 and the International Union for Conservation of Nature (IUCN)  categorise this species as vulnerable.

References

Bamboo lemurs
Mammals described in 1987
Endemic fauna of Madagascar